FRED (Film Radio Entertainment & Dialogue) is a London based multichannel internet radio station, focusing on the world of independent cinema and international film festivals.

FRED was launched at the Venice International Film Festival in August 2011. initially with three channels: one in English, one in Italian and FRED Extra, which broadcasts press conferences and seminars. FRED has since expanded to 29 channels; 25 language channels, adding German, Polish, Spanish, French, Portuguese, Romanian, Slovenian, Chinese, Korean, Japanese, Arabic, Bulgarian, Croatian, Latvian, Danish, Hungarian, Dutch, Greek, Czech, Lithuanian, Slovac and Icelandic to the original English and Italian channels. It also broadcasts in the minority language Sardinian (Sardu) and has expanded its sector specific channels, adding FRED Industry, FRED Education and FRED Entertainment to the original FRED Extra.

FRED’s aim is to appeal to everyone involved in film festivals and anyone who would like to be. It provides in-depth information and targeted entertainment around the industry, hence its tagline “The Festival Insider”.

FRED frequently broadcasts from festivals around the world, from the niche, to the larger, more internationally recognised festivals, including Cannes, Berlin, Venice, London, Turin, Rome, Tribeca, and Sydney.  It is now the official international web station of Venice International Film Festival and an official media partner of a number of festivals and specific festival sections or connected events, such as Torino Film Festival, Taormina Film Fest, Spanish London Film Festival, Cinema du Reel, Venice Days, Berlinale Talents, Venice International Critics Week, Talents Sarajevo, Young Audience Awards, Europa Distribution.

FRED broadcasts online, via apps on mobile telephones and other mobile devices and its content is also available to download for free as a podcast from iTunes.

FRED launched the multilingual and multicultural “Fred at School” project in 2015, partly financed by the European Commission Creative Europe, with the purpose of educating young people in film literacy and developing new audiences for European cinema. It focused on secondary school students in European schools, inclusive of students with sight or hearing impairments through the use of subtitles or audio description. The students reviewed four films shortlisted by the European Parliament’s Lux Prize competition. They then broadcast their thoughts and reviews on the relevant FRED radio platforms and chose an overall winner

References

External links

 Fred.fm

Internet radio in the United Kingdom
Talk radio stations